Stomorska is a village and a cadastral in Croatia, on the northern coast of Šolta island in the Split-Dalmatia County. It is connected by the D111 highway. Stomorska is the oldest town on the island on the water. The place is well connected and has a gastronomic marina.

During the time of the Austro-Hungarian Empire the villages of Šolta still have their Italian names as well as Stomosca.

References

External links 

 
  (Official page of Šolta)

Populated places in Split-Dalmatia County
Šolta